In baseball, a save (abbreviated SV or S) is credited to a pitcher who finishes a game for the winning team under certain prescribed circumstances. Most commonly a pitcher earns a save by entering in the ninth inning of a game in which his team is winning by three or fewer runs and finishing the game by pitching one inning without losing the lead. The number of saves or percentage of save opportunities successfully converted are oft-cited statistics of relief pitchers, particularly those in the closer role. The save statistic was created by journalist Jerome Holtzman in 1959 to "measure the effectiveness of relief pitchers" and was adopted as an official Major League Baseball (MLB) statistic in 1969. The save has been retroactively tabulated for pitchers before that date. Mariano Rivera is MLB's all-time leader in regular-season saves with 652, while Francisco Rodríguez earned the most saves in a single season with 62 in 2008.

History
The term save was being used as far back as 1952. Executives Jim Toomey of the St. Louis Cardinals, Allan Roth of the Los Angeles Dodgers and Irv Kaze of the Pittsburgh Pirates awarded saves to pitchers who finished winning games but were not credited with the win, regardless of the margin of victory. The statistic went largely unnoticed.

A formula with more criteria for saves was invented in 1960 by baseball writer Jerome Holtzman. He felt that the existing statistics at the time, earned run average (ERA) and win–loss record (W-L), did not sufficiently measure a reliever's effectiveness. ERA does not account for inherited runners a reliever allows to score, and W-L record does not account for relievers protecting leads. Elroy Face of the Pittsburgh Pirates was 18–1 in 1959; however, Holtzman wrote that in 10 of the 18 wins, Face allowed the tying or lead run but got the win when the Pirates offense regained the lead. Holtzman felt that Face was more effective the previous year when he was 5–2. When Holtzman presented the idea to J. G. Taylor Spink, publisher of The Sporting News, "[Spink] gave [Holtzman] a $100 bonus. Maybe it was $200." Holtzman recorded the unofficial save statistic in The Sporting News weekly for nine years before it became official in 1969. In conjunction with publishing the statistic, The Sporting News in 1960 also introduced the Fireman of the Year Award, which was awarded based on a combination of saves and wins.

It was MLB's first new major statistic since the run batted in was added in 1920.

Notable saves
On April 7, 1969, Bill Singer was credited with the first official save when he pitched three shutout innings in relief of Don Drysdale in the Los Angeles Dodgers' 3–2 Opening Day victory over the Cincinnati Reds at Crosley Field.

On April 27, 1969, Frank Linzy of the San Francisco Giants became the first pitcher to be credited with two saves in one day, registering saves in both games of a doubleheader against the Houston Astros.

On April 29, 1970, Stan Williams of the Minnesota Twins became the first pitcher credited with a save without facing a batter. In a home game against the Cleveland Indians with the Twins holding a 1–0 lead, Williams entered in relief of Jim Kaat in the top of the ninth inning with two outs and runners on first and second; he then picked off runner Tony Horton at second base, ending the game.

On September 3, 2002, the Texas Rangers won 7–1 over the Baltimore Orioles as Joaquín Benoit pitched a seven-inning save, the longest save since it had become an official statistic in 1969. Benoit relieved Todd Van Poppel (who entered the game in the first inning after starter Aaron Myette was ejected for throwing at Melvin Mora) at the start of the third inning, and finished the game while allowing just one hit. The official scorer credited the win to Van Poppel and not Benoit, a decision that was also supported by Texas manager Jerry Narron.

On August 22, 2007, Wes Littleton earned a save with the largest winning margin ever, pitching the last three innings of a 30–3 Texas Rangers win over the Baltimore Orioles. Littleton entered the game with a 14–3 lead, and the final 27-run differential broke the previous record for a save by eight runs. The New York Times noted that "there are the preposterous saves, of which Littleton's now stands out as No. 1."

On October 29, 2014, in Game 7 of the 2014 World Series, Madison Bumgarner of the San Francisco Giants recorded the longest save in World Series history, pitching five scoreless innings of relief in a 3–2 victory over the Kansas City Royals.

Usage
In baseball statistics, the term save is used to indicate the successful maintenance of a lead by a relief pitcher, usually the closer, until the end of the game. A save is a statistic credited to a relief pitcher, as set forth in Rule 9.19 of the Official Rules of Major League Baseball; the current definition has been in place since 1975. That rule states the official scorer shall credit a pitcher with a save when such pitcher meets all four of the following conditions:
 He is the finishing pitcher in a game won by his team;
 He is not the winning pitcher;
 He is credited with at least ⅓ of an inning pitched; and
 He satisfies one of the following conditions:
 He enters the game with a lead of no more than three runs and pitches for at least one inning
 He enters the game with the potential tying run either on base, at bat or on deck
 He pitches for at least three innings.

The definition of a save has not always been the same. As initially defined in 1969, a relief pitcher could earn a save if he entered a game with his team in the lead and he held the lead through the end of the game, regardless of the score or for how long he pitched. This produced some especially "easy" saves, such as Ron Taylor being credited with a save after pitching a scoreless ninth inning in a 20–6 New York Mets win over the Atlanta Braves in August 1971. In 1974, tougher criteria were adopted for saves where either the tying run had to be on base or at the plate when the reliever entered to qualify for a save, or the reliever had to preserve a lead of any size for at least three innings in completing a game. The rule was slightly relaxed in 1975 to the current definition as outlined above. Statistical sites, including MLB.com, include saves in pitching records prior to 1969 by retroactively applying the 1969 criteria.

Related statistics
The ratio of saves to save opportunities is save percentage. A save opportunity (or "save situation") occurs when a reliever enters a game in a situation that permits him to earn a save. Note that a pitcher who enters a game in a save situation and does not finish the game, but departs with his team still leading, is not charged with a save opportunity.

If a relief pitcher satisfies all of the criteria for a save except he does not finish the game, he will often be credited with a hold (abbreviated H), which is a statistic that is not officially recognized by Major League Baseball.

A blown save (abbreviated BS; alternately BSV or B) occurs when a reliever in a save situation surrenders the lead (allows the tying run, or more, to score). Like the hold, the blown save statistic is not officially recognized by Major League Baseball. The blown save was adopted as part of the points system used by the Rolaids Relief Man Award starting in 1988. Note that if the tying run was scored by a runner who was already on base when the reliever entered the game, the reliever will be charged with a blown save even though the run is charged to the pitcher who allowed that runner to reach base. A reliever cannot blow multiple saves in a game unless he has multiple save opportunities, a situation only possible if the reliever temporarily switches to another defensive position, then returns to pitching.

Criticism

As Francisco Rodríguez pursued the single-season saves record in 2008, Baseball Prospectus member Joe Sheehan, Sports Illustrated writer Tom Verducci, and The New York Sun writer Tim Marchman wrote that Rodríguez's save total was enhanced by the number of opportunities his team presented, allowing him to amass one particular statistic. They thought that Rodríguez on his record-breaking march was less effective than in prior years. Sheehan offered that saves did not account for a pitcher's proficiency at preventing runs nor did it reflect leads that were not preserved.

Bradford Doolittle of The Kansas City Star wrote, "[The closer] is the only example in sports of a statistic creating a job."  He decried the best relievers pitching fewer innings starting in the 1980s with their workload being reduced from two- to one-inning outings while less efficient pitchers were pitching those innings instead. ESPN.com columnist Jim Caple has argued that the save statistic has turned the closer position into "the most overrated position in sports". Caple and others contend that using one's best reliever in situations such as a three-run lead in the ninth—when a team will almost certainly win even with a lesser pitcher—is foolish, and that using a closer in the traditional fireman role exemplified by pitchers such as Goose Gossage is far wiser. (A "fireman" situation is men on base in a tied or close game, hence a reliever ending such a threat is "putting out the fire.")

Firemen frequently pitched two- or three-inning outings to earn saves. The modern closer, reduced to a one-inning role, is available to pitch more save opportunities. In the past, a reliever pitching three innings one game would be unavailable to pitch the next game. Gossage had more saves of at least two innings than saves where he pitched one inning or less. "The times I did a one-inning save, I felt guilty about it. It's like it was too easy", said Gossage. ESPN.com wrote that saves have not been determined to be "a special, repeatable skill—rather than simply a function of opportunities". It also noted that blown saves are "non-qualitative", pointing out that both Gossage and Rollie Fingers, who each had over 100 career blown saves, were both inducted into the Baseball Hall of Fame. Fran Zimniuch in Fireman: The Evolution of the Closer in Baseball wrote, "But you have to be a great relief pitcher to blow that many saves. Clearly, [Gossage] saved many, many more than he did not save." More than half of Gossage's and Fingers' blown saves came in tough save situations, where the tying run was on base when the pitcher entered. In nearly half of their blown tough saves, they entered the game in the sixth or seventh inning. Multiple-inning outings provide more chances for a reliever to blow a save.  The pitchers need to get out of the initial situation and pitch additional innings with more chances to lose the lead. A study by the Baseball Hall of Fame found modern closers were put into fewer tough save situations compared to past relievers. The modern closer also earned significantly more "easy saves", defined as saves starting the ninth inning with more than a one-run lead. The study offered "praise to the combatants who faced more danger for more innings."

Nate Silver of FiveThirtyEight has suggested the "goose egg", a new statistic that he considers to be a better evaluation of relief performance than the save. A reliever earns a goose egg for each scoreless inning pitched (no earned or unearned runs, no inherited runners score) in the seventh inning or later, where when he starts the inning: the score is tied, his team holds a lead of no more than two runs, or the tying run is on base or at the plate. Should the reliever be charged with an earned run in a goose egg situation, he will be credited with a "broken egg", the counterpart of the blown save, unless he finishes the game. The statistic is named for Goose Gossage, who is the all-time leader in goose eggs but recorded relatively few saves compared to modern closers.

In the piece in which he introduced the "goose egg" concept, Silver added more criticisms of the save, noting, "It doesn’t give a pitcher any additional reward for pitching multiple innings — even though two clutch innings pitched in relief are roughly twice as valuable as one. And a pitcher doesn’t get a save for pitching in a tie game, even though it’s one of the highest-leverage situations." He also considered saves and blown saves "highly punitive to guys who aren’t closers." As an example, Silver noted that in the 2016 season, Chicago White Sox middle reliever Nate Jones, who by Silver's calculations converted 83% of his goose opportunities, led the American League in blown saves with nine, while only recording three saves. Silver added, "The problem is that you can only get a save if you finish the game, whereas blown saves aren’t restricted to the final inning."

Leaders in Major League Baseball

Saves
The statistic was formally introduced in 1969, although research has identified saves earned prior to that point.

Key

Most saves in a career
Below are the 10 Major League Baseball players with the most saves in a career.

Stats updated through March 29th, 2023

Progression of career saves leaders
The following 14 pitchers have led the major leagues in total saves for a career, since the formation of the National Association of Professional Base Ball Players (NA) in 1871. This table is based on career totals at the end of each baseball season, including retroactive application of the saves definition prior to 1969, when it was first recognized as an official statistic by MLB.

Notes:
 Mullane and Nichols shared the record from 1899 through 1903.
 Mullane pitched both right-handed and left-handed.

Most in a single season
Below are the Major League Baseball players who have recorded 50 or more saves in a single season.

Stats updated through 2020 season

Most consecutive without a blown save

Stats updated through 2019 season

Blown saves

Career
The below table lists MLB pitchers who have accrued 80 or more blown saves during their careers.
 

Stats updated through 2020 season

Single season
The below table lists MLB pitchers who have accrued 13 or more blown saves during a single season.

Stats updated through 2020 season

Notes

References

External links
Career Leaders & Records for Saves at Baseball-Reference.com
Saves Records at Baseball Almanac

Pitching statistics